Sufian Sar (also Romanized as Şūfīān Sar; also known as Sūfūn Sar) is a village in Deylaman Rural District, Deylaman District, Siahkal County, Gilan Province, Iran. At the 2006 census, its population was 12, in 4 families.

References 

Populated places in Siahkal County